Ichaka Diarra (born 18 January 1995) is a Malian professional footballer who plays as a defender for  club Ansar.

Club career 
Diarra signed for Ansar in the 2021–22 Lebanese Premier League, and renewed his contract in summer 2022 for one year.

International career
Diarra made his debut for Mali on 24 March 2021 in an Africa Cup of Nations qualifier against Guinea.

Honours 
Ansar
 Lebanese FA Cup runner-up: 2021–22

References

External links
 
 
 

1995 births
Living people
Sportspeople from Bamako
Malian footballers
Association football defenders
AS Onze Créateurs de Niaréla players
Stade Malien players
Djoliba AC players
Espérance Sportive de Tunis players
Speranța Nisporeni players
Buildcon F.C. players
ASC Jaraaf players
Al-Thoqbah Club players
Al-Arabi SC (Saudi Arabia) players
Sahab SC players
Al Ansar FC players
Malian Première Division players
Tunisian Ligue Professionnelle 1 players
Moldovan Super Liga players
Zambia Super League players
Senegal Premier League players
Saudi First Division League players
Saudi Second Division players
Jordanian Pro League players
Lebanese Premier League players
Mali international footballers
Malian expatriate footballers
Malian expatriate sportspeople in Tunisia
Malian expatriate sportspeople in Moldova
Malian expatriate sportspeople in Zambia
Malian expatriate sportspeople in Senegal
Malian expatriate sportspeople in Saudi Arabia
Malian expatriate sportspeople in Jordan
Malian expatriate sportspeople in Lebanon
Expatriate footballers in Tunisia
Expatriate footballers in Moldova
Expatriate footballers in Zambia
Expatriate footballers in Senegal
Expatriate footballers in Saudi Arabia
Expatriate footballers in Jordan
Expatriate footballers in Lebanon